Elman Mukhtarov (born December 12, 1994) is an Azerbaijani wrestler who participated at the 2010 Summer Youth Olympics in Singapore. He won the gold medal for Azerbaijan in the boys' Greco-Roman 50 kg event, defeating Nurbek Hakkulov of Uzbekistan in the final. He competed in the 2019 World Championship but was eliminated in the second round by Armenia's Slavik Galstyan.

References 

Living people
1994 births
Wrestlers at the 2010 Summer Youth Olympics
European Games bronze medalists for Azerbaijan
European Games medalists in wrestling
Wrestlers at the 2015 European Games
Azerbaijani male sport wrestlers
Youth Olympic gold medalists for Azerbaijan
21st-century Azerbaijani people